Cavendish is a village and civil parish in the Stour Valley in Suffolk, England.

History 

It is believed that Cavendish is called so because a man called Cafa once owned an eddish (pasture for aftermath) here. Over time, 'Cafan Eddish' became 'Cavendish'. It was home to Sir John Cavendish, the ancestor of the Dukes of Devonshire, who was involved in suppressing the Peasants' Revolt. Wat Tyler, the peasants' leader, was arrested by William Walworth, the Mayor of London, for threatening King Richard II in 1381. As Tyler fought back, Cavendish's son, also called John, who was responsible for escorting the King, ran Tyler through with his sword, killing him. As a result, John Cavendish tried to flee from the pursuing peasants, and he hung on to the handle of the door of St Mary's Church to plead sanctuary. A few days later, on 15 June 1381, the elder John Cavendish was seized at Bury St Edmunds and beheaded by a mob led by Jack Straw. He is buried in Bury St Edmunds. St Mary's Church had a bequest from Sir John, and its chancel was restored.

The village has a United Reformed Church, where Catholic services are also held, and three pubs - the Five Bells, the George, and the Bull. Leonard Lord Cheshire and his wife Sue Ryder are buried in Cavendish Cemetery and there is a memorial to them within St Mary's Church. The museum at Cavendish is now closed but history of the Sue Ryder Foundation and life at the Cavendish home may be obtained from the Sue Ryder legacy and history team. As Cavendish was begun as a home for concentration camp survivors the charity holds some records of the people who were rescued by Sue Ryder.

Other notable people 
 George Cavendish (1497 – ca.1562) an English writer, known as the biographer of Cardinal Thomas Wolsey.
 Sir William Cavendish MP (ca.1505 – 1557) a politician, knight and courtier.

Events 
Village events are regularly held on the village green. Cavendish holds an annual summer fete, which is held in September, as well as a smaller fete, which is organised earlier in the year by the local church, along with an annual fireworks event.

References

External links

 Foxearth and District Local Historical Society - Articles on the history of Cavendish and the surrounding area 
Cavendish at Vision of Britain website

Villages in Suffolk
Civil parishes in Suffolk
Borough of St Edmundsbury